Open or OPEN may refer to:

Music
 Open (band), Australian pop/rock band
 The Open (band), English indie rock band
 Open (Blues Image album), 1969
 Open (Gotthard album), 1999
 Open (Cowboy Junkies album), 2001
 Open (YFriday album), 2001
 Open (Shaznay Lewis album), 2004
 Open (Jon Anderson EP), 2011
 Open (Stick Men album), 2012
 Open (The Necks album), 2013
 Open (Kwon Eun-bi EP), 2021
 Open, a 1967 album by Julie Driscoll, Brian Auger and the Trinity
 Open, a 1979 album by Steve Hillage
 "Open" (Queensrÿche song)
 "Open" (Mýa song)
 "Open", the first song on The Cure album Wish

Literature 
 Open (Mexican magazine), a lifestyle Mexican publication
 Open (Indian magazine), an Indian weekly English language magazine featuring current affairs
 OPEN (North Dakota magazine), an out-of-print magazine that was printed in the Fargo, North Dakota area of the U.S.
 Open: An Autobiography, Andre Agassi's 2009 memoir

Computing and mathematics 
 Open (process), a program launcher invoked from the command line in NeXTSTEP or Mac OS X
 Open (system call), standardized system call for opening files
 Open set, in mathematics
 Open interval, in mathematics
 Open line segment, in mathematics
 Open map, in mathematics

Film and television
 Open (2011 film), a 2011 film
 Open (2019 film), a 2019 film
Open TV, television channel in Greece

Other uses
 Open (sport), type of competition in tennis, golf and other sports where entry is open to qualifiers regardless of amateur or professional status
 Open...., the original interactive television service on BSkyBs Sky Digital platform
 Online Protection and Enforcement of Digital Trade Act, a bill in the United States Congress to combat online piracy
 Organization of Pakistani Entrepreneurs of North America, a not-for-profit organization
 One-Pair Ethernet, a specification of the OPEN Alliance SIG
 Open Cycle, a bicycle manufacturer

See also 
 Opening (disambiguation)
 The Open (disambiguation)
 OpenEd, an online catalog of educational media
 Open-source software, a type of computer software
 Openness, concept or philosophy that is characterized by an emphasis on transparency and collaboration